171st meridian can refer to:

171st meridian east, a line of longitude east of the Greenwich Meridian
171st meridian west, a line of longitude west of the Greenwich Meridian